Tony Award for Best Scenic Design in a Musical is an award for outstanding set design of a musical. The award was first presented in 1960 after the category of Best Scenic Design was divided into Scenic Design in a Play and Scenic Design in a Musical with each genre receiving its own award.  Between 1962 and 2004, the award was re-combined to Best Scenic Design before being split again in 2005.

Winners and nominees

1960s

2000s

2010s

2020s

See also
 Tony Award for Best Scenic Design in a Play
 Drama Desk Award for Outstanding Scenic Design of a Musical
 Laurence Olivier Award for Best Set Design

External links
Tony Awards Official site
Tony Awards at Internet Broadway database Listing
Tony Awards at broadwayworld.com

Tony Awards
Awards established in 1960
1960 establishments in New York City